The Stone is a Serbian black metal band from Belgrade formed in 1996. They were originally known as Stone to Flesh and changed their name to The Stone in 2001.

Biography
The Stone was born in 1996. At first they were known under a different band name, Stone to Flesh. In February '97, the first demo called "Serbian Woods" was recorded followed by first live appearances. "Killed by the Sun" demo was taped a year after and the band was reached by Greek label Demonion Productions which asked if they were willing to release both demo materials on tape version, and soon after the first official release, titled "Unveiled Evil" was celebrated. In winter 1999/2000, the band recorded "Some Wounds Bleed Forever", first full-length manifest which was later released by CCP Records.

After changing its name to The Stone in 2001, the band signed to Wolfcult Productions (Solistitium Productions); and in spring of 2002 released "Slovenska krv" ("Slavic Blood"), the second full-length and first one under The Stone banner. Meanwhile, the "Tragom hromoga vuka" CD was out in March '03, presenting two brand new songs and both demo materials included.

In winter 2003/'04, "Zakon Velesa" ("The Law of Veles"), the third full-length album was recorded and released a few months after. This marks the end of cooperation with Solistitium Records.

In December 2004, the "Čujete li, smeju nam se mrtvi" EP was released through Czech label Eclipse Productions, consisting of two completely new tracks.

In August 2005, The Stone signed a deal with German label Folter Records and by the end of June 2006, the fourth full-length album "Magla" ("The Fog") was released. Few months later, a live 7-inch split EP with Czech Inferno was out on Undercover Records, as well as split DVD with May Result on Pagan Flames Productions (US). During the next couple of years band was very active with live performances, but having one more release ahead - re-pressing of the debut record on Serbian label Grom Records, this time with different artwork, different album name, two bonus songs and video.

In winter of 2008 The Stone entered "Draft" studio to record four songs for its first 10-inch MLP entitled "Old Wounds Bleed Misanthropy". Two old songs are re-recorded, as well as some cover versions of Slayer and Master's Hammer, to be released on Diabolist Services Cult (US) during 2009. Czech label Zero Budget Production has released The Stone's first demo, "Serbian Woods", on limited 7-inch picture vinyl and also Folter Records released a limited vinyl version of now The Stone's classic second album "Slovenska krv" ("Slavic Blood").

The band was very active with live gigs during 2008 and on October 4 entered the studio in order to record their fifth full-length album titled "Umro" ("Deceased") which will be released in April 2009 through Folter Records. This was considered to be by far the most mature release by the band. At the same time, two more songs were recorded and used for a release of split 7-inch EP titled "The Ancestral Alliance" with Italian band Kult. Also German mini tour with Lugubre was settled for the end of April as well as more live appearances, including extensive touring through Europe with Romanian band Negura Bunget in 2010.

2011 saw the release of band's sixth full-length album "Golet" ("The Barrenness") and again through Berlin-based Folter Records. 15 September was chosen as a date of release, the same day The Stone was to embark on a European tour in support of cult Seattle black metal group Inquisition, here also followed by Portuguese band Corpus Christii and Canada's Revenge.

Band members

Current
Glad – vocals (2006-2011, 2018–present)
Kozeljnik – guitars (1996–present)
Vrag - bass (2015–present)
Honza Kapák - drums (2016–present)

Former
Nefas – vocals (1996–2006, 2011–2018), vocals (only studio) (2006–2011)
Ilija Vasiljević – drums (2001–2003)
Blizzard – guitars (1996–1998)
God Of Perversion – bass (1996–2001)
Adimiron – drums (1996–2001)
Aksinomantijan – drums (2003–2006)
Ved – drums (2006–2007)
Urok - keyboards (2001-2011)
Usud - bass (2011-2015), live drums (2012–2020)
L.G. - drums (2007-2016)
Demonetras – guitars (2004–2020)

Session
Odious – bass (2011)

Timeline

Discography

Studio albums
Some Wounds Bleed Forever (2000) as Stone to Flesh
Slovenska Krv ("Slavic Blood") (2002)
Zakon Velesa ("The Law of Veles") (2004)
Magla ("The Fog") (2006)
Umro ("Deceased") (2009)
Golet ("The Barrenness") (2011)
Crna Hronika ("Black Chronicle") (2013)
Nekroza ("Necrosis") (2014)
Teatar Apsurda ("Theatre of the Absurd") (2017)
Kosturnice ("Ossuaries") (2021)

EPs
Čujete Li, Smeju Nam Se Mrtvi... (2004)
Triumph Dark Brotherhood (2007)
The Ancestral Alliance (2009)
Old Wounds Bleed Misanthropy (2010)
Kruna praha (2019)

Compilation albums
Unveiled Evil (1999) as Stone to Flesh
Tragom Hromog Vuka ("Tracking the Limping Wolf") (2003)
Neke Rane Krvare Večno ("Some Wounds Bleed Forever") (2007)

Demos
Serbian Woods (1997) as Stone to Flesh
Killed by the Sun (1998) as Stone to Flesh

References

External links
Official website
Bandcamp
Big Cartel
Mizantrope Records' Big Cartel
Facebook
Instagram
Myspace
Soundcloud

Serbian black metal musical groups
Musical groups established in 1996
Musical groups from Belgrade